The Rio Open, also known as the Rio Open presented by Claro for sponsorship reasons, is a tennis event on the ATP Tour and former WTA International Tournaments event. The tournament is played on outdoor clay courts at the Jockey Club Brasileiro in Rio de Janeiro, Brazil. It is the only ATP Tour 500 event in South America and the only ATP Tour event in Brazil (since 2020).

History
The first edition in 2014 was headlined by former world number one, Rafael Nadal and fellow Spanish player David Ferrer. Both of them are well known clay court specialists.

The Rio de Janeiro Open with indoor carpet courts from 1989 to 1990 was the first ATP World Series played in Brazil.

The women's tournament was discontinued and replaced by Hungarian Ladies Open after 2016 edition.

For the 2019 edition, there was plan to move the tournament from the clay court surface in Jockey Club Brasileiro to the outdoor hard courts at the Olympic Tennis Centre, which hosted the tennis events of the 2016 Summer Olympics situated in Barra Olympic Park. The reason behind was to attract more world class players in the tournament such as Novak Djokovic, Roger Federer, and Andy Murray who consistently declined to play the event. Juan Martin del Potro once mentioned to the Rio Open director Luiz Carvalho that he will play Rio Open when the surface changes.

Past finals

Men's singles

Men's doubles

Women's singles

Women's doubles

See also
 Rio de Janeiro Open – men's Grand Prix tournament (1989–1990)
 Rio Tennis Classic – men's Challenger tournament (2017)

References

External links 
 
 Tournament info at ATP

 
Tennis tournaments in Brazil
Clay court tennis tournaments
ATP Tour 500
WTA Tour
Recurring sporting events established in 2014
2014 establishments in Brazil
Sports competitions in Rio de Janeiro (city)